Johanna Dorothea Lindenaer, also Johanna Dorothea Zoutelande or Madame de Zoutelandt, (1664–1737) was a Dutch writer, memoirist and translator. She was also a suspected traitor as a suspected spy.

She was arrested in 1703 under the name dowager Van Domburg in Maastricht for spying in connection to the war of the Spanish succession, but managed to escape in 1704. She emigrated to Paris, where she converted to Roman Catholicism and became a writer.

Works
 Aanwijsing der heilsame politike gronden en maximen (translation)
  Memoires (1710) - memoirs
 La Babylone demasquée (1727)

References
 

18th-century Dutch writers
18th-century spies
1664 births
1737 deaths
Dutch autobiographers
Dutch-language writers
18th-century Dutch women writers
Female wartime spies
Women in 18th-century warfare
Converts to Roman Catholicism
Women in war in the Netherlands
Women autobiographers
People of the War of the Spanish Succession
Women memoirists